Highway Technologies, Inc. was a large, Houston-based US construction company with offices in 33 cities that filed for bankruptcy in May 2013, laying off 740 of its 825 employees.
The company was founded 30 years ago.

The company supplied "highway barriers, traffic control devices and rent[ed] barriers for detours and emergency closures".

Liquidation of company assets began in June 2013 and continued through November 2013, with some local branches sold in their entirety to new owners.

Locations
The company operated in over 30 US cities,
with as many as 50 to 80 employees at some locations:
 Flagstaff, Arizona
 Fort Mohave, Arizona
 Prescott, Arizona (reopened as part of Trafficade Work Zone Services)
 Tempe, Arizona
 Tucson, Arizona
 San Jose, California
 Ventura, California
 Denver, Colorado, reopened as Colorado Barricade in August 2013.
 Loveland, Colorado
 Clearwater, Florida
 Fort Myers, Florida
 Jacksonville, Florida 
 Jupiter, Florida 
 Orlando, Florida  
 Bloomington, Illinois  
 Carbondale, Illinois
 East St. Louis, Illinois, reopened as Warning Lites of Southern Illinois, LLC in August 2013
 Springfield, Illinois
 Villa Park, Illinois
 Baton Rouge, Louisiana
 Minneapolis, Minnesota
 Springfield, Missouri
 Missoula, Montana
 Richland, New Jersey
 North Las Vegas, Nevada
 Portland, Oregon
 Austin, Texas
 Corpus Christi, Texas
 Fort Worth, Texas
 Houston, Texas
 San Antonio, Texas

Company bankruptcy
The Houston-based company laid off 740 employees, of 825 total, on May 17, 2013, and filed for bankruptcy on May 22.
The bankruptcy filing indicated that company assets were between $50 and $100 million while liabilities were between $100 and $500 million.

Disruptions
Event disruptions occurred as a result of the suspension of operations in a number of cities.  In Denver, the Colfax Marathon and the American Ninja Warrior competition lost the contracted support services for the provision of traffic barricades for the event. Fifteen active projects were shut down in Montana by the closure of the Missoula office, where 180 employees lost their jobs.

Liquidation
"Bankruptcy was seen as the best option to protect the company's assets for its creditors".
At the May 23, 2013, bankruptcy court hearing, approval was given "to start to sell any assets below $200,000. The company pursued the sale of its assets both piecemeal and on a turnkey — intact branches — basis through private sales and auctions"

Some Highway Technologies local enterprises were sold in their entirety to new owners.
In early August, the Denver branch emerged from bankruptcy as Colorado Barricade, sold at a price of  plus assumption of certain liabilities pertaining solely to the existing operation, and hired back some 20 of the 50-plus employees of Highway Technologies Denver operation within the first week of operation.

Over 60,000 remaining assets were sold off in auctions held between August and November 2013,
including 4700 items sold at one two-day auction in Texas in late August.

References

Construction and civil engineering companies of the United States
Defunct construction and civil engineering companies
Construction and civil engineering companies disestablished in 2013